The Travelers Hotel on Main Street in Noonan, North Dakota, United States, is a hotel that was built in 1910. Sharpshooter Annie Oakley and railroad executive James J. Hill have both stayed at the hotel.

It was listed on the National Register of Historic Places in 2010.

References

Buildings designated early commercial in the National Register of Historic Places
Hotel buildings completed in 1910
Hotel buildings on the National Register of Historic Places in North Dakota
National Register of Historic Places in Divide County, North Dakota
1910 establishments in North Dakota